H. Byron Earhart (born 1935) is an American historian, Ph.D, and author, especially about Japanese religions.

Life and studies 
He was born on January 7, 1935, in Aledo, Illinois; son of Kenneth Harry and Mary (Haack) Earhart. His father enlisted in the U.S. Navy in 1942 and served on the battleship USS Missouri. His grandparents and mother held a frozen food locker in Havana, Illinois. H. Byron Earhart married Virginia Margaret Donaho in 1956 and they had three children.

Earhart attended Knox College in Galesburg, majoring in philosophy and religion. He enrolled at the University of Chicago in a graduate program, got a Fulbright grant and went to Japan for three years of doctoral research. He studied under Mircea Eliade and Joseph M. Kitagawa at the University of Chicago, where he received a doctorate in History of Religions.

Career 
He is a professor emeritus in the Department of Comparative Religion at Western Michigan University from which he received in 1981 a Distinguished Faculty Scholar Award.

His textbook Japanese Religion: Unity and Diversity  (1969) is considered a classic, through several editions, and "has remained one of the only treatments of Japanese religious history truly suitable for use in undergraduate classrooms".

Bibliography (excerpts) 
 Japanese Religion: Unity and Diversity, 1969, and later editions, also as Religion in Japan: Unity and Diversity
The new religions of Japan: a bibliography of Western-language materials. xi, 96 pp. Tokyo: Sophia University, 1970. University of Michigan, 1983, pp. 213.
  1997
 Religions of Japan: Many Traditions Within One Sacred Way , 1984, 1998
 Religious Traditions of the World: A Journey Through Africa, Mesoamerica, North America, Judaism, Christianity, Islam, 1993
 Mount Fuji: Icon of Japan, Columbia: The University of South Carolina Press, 2011

References

External links
 H. Byron Earhart, Western Michigan University

21st-century American historians
American historians of religion
American male non-fiction writers
Living people
1935 births